The Holocaust Kid is a semi-autobiographical novel by Sonia Pilcer.

Plot summary
The book has fifteen stories that is loosely based on the life of author Sonia Pilcer. Zosha Palovsky, who prefers to call herself Zoe, was born in Europe in a camp for DPs. She moved to New York City with her parents, Genia and Heniek, when she was a toddler. Zoe reconciles her dreams with her parents' experiences. The first story called Do You Deserve To Lie is narrated by Zoe who works for a movie magazine and does things that her parents doesn't appreciate. Two stories tell about how Genia was saved from the gas chambers and how she met Heniek after the war. In another story, it talks about how Heniek escaped from Auschwitz. Other stories have to do with Zoe appreciating her parents more, marrying, and going on vacation with her parents.

Reception
It was reviewed by Kirkus Reviews.
It was reviewed by Publishers Weekly.
It was reviewed by Booklist.

References

2002 American novels
Personal accounts of the Holocaust
American autobiographical novels